, better known by his stage name World's End Girlfriend, is a Japanese musician from Gotō Islands, Nagasaki Prefecture. He is the founder of the record label Virgin Babylon Records.

Biography
Katsuhiko Maeda was born on 1 November 1975 in Gotō Islands, Nagasaki Prefecture. At the age of 10, he started making music.

His debut studio album, Ending Story, was released in 2000. It was followed by Farewell Kingdom (2001). In 2005, he released a collaborative album with Mono, titled Palmless Prayer / Mass Murder Refrain. In February 2007, American webzine Somewhere Cold voted Palmless Prayer / Mass Murder Refrain No. 7 on their 2006 Somewhere Cold Awards Hall of Fame.

He released Hurtbreak Wonderland in 2007, Seven Idiots in 2010, and Last Waltz in 2016.

He has also written the score for films such as Air Doll and Starry Starry Night.

Discography

Studio albums
 Ending Story (2000)
 Farewell Kingdom (2001)
 Dream's End Come True (2002)
 Enchanted Landscape Escape (2002) 
 The Lie Lay Land (2005)
 Palmless Prayer / Mass Murder Refrain (2005) 
 Hurtbreak Wonderland (2007)
 Seven Idiots (2010)
 Voices of Days Past (2015) 
 Last Waltz (2016)

Soundtrack albums
 Air Doll (2009)
 Starry Starry Night (2011)
 Tasha Tudor: A Still Water Story (2017)
 A Girl on the Shore (2021)

Compilation albums
 Last Waltz Remix (2017)

Live albums
 Song to the Siren: Live 3.11 (2015)
 Live/10/10/2015 (2016)
 Last Waltz in Tokyo (2018)

EPs
 Sky Short Story (2000)
 Division One (2010)
 Division Two (2010)
 Other Voices (2010)
 I Know You (2012)
 Story Telling Again and Again (2012)
 Yudechang (2013) 
 Girls/Boys Song (2014)
 Requiem EP (2017) 
 Meguri (2018)

Singles
 "Xmas Song" (2001) 
 "Halfmoon Girl" (2001) 
 "Kimi o Nosete: Nausicaa Requiem" (2007) 
 "Boy" (2017)
 "Eve" (2019) 
 "Rendering the Soul" (2019)
 "Re-Rendering the Soul (Yaporigami Remix)" (2020)
 "In the Name of Love" (2021)
 "Black Box Fake Fact" (2022)

References

External links
 
 

1975 births
Living people
Musicians from Nagasaki Prefecture
Japanese electronic musicians
Erased Tapes Records artists